The  was an infantry division of the Imperial Japanese Army. It was formed 10 July 1944 in Henan as a type-C(hei) security division, simultaneously with the 114th, 117th and 118th divisions. The nucleus for the formation was the 7th Independent Mixed Brigade. The division was initially assigned to the Twelfth Army.

Action
In March 1945, the division was reinforced by a mortar company and sent to participate in the Battle of West Henan–North Hubei. In April 1945 it occupied Laohekou.

The division was detained in a labour camp in Henan after the surrender of Japan 15 August 1945. 23 April 1946, it sailed from Shanghai and arrived at Nagato, Yamaguchi 30 April 1946. The division was disbanded by 10 June 1946.

See also
 List of Japanese Infantry Divisions
Independent Mixed Brigades (Imperial Japanese Army)

Notes and references
This article incorporates material from Japanese Wikipedia page 第115師団 (日本軍), accessed 27 June 2016
 Madej, W. Victor, Japanese Armed Forces Order of Battle, 1937–1945 [2 vols], Allentown, PA: 1981.

Japanese World War II divisions
Infantry divisions of Japan
Military units and formations established in 1944
Military units and formations disestablished in 1946
1944 establishments in Japan
1946 disestablishments in Japan